Dundee and Angus College is a further education college in the Tayside region of Scotland. It was created on 1 November 2013 as a merger of Angus College and Dundee College. It is the only college in Dundee, and, with approximately 23,000 enrolments, is one of the largest in the country.

Campuses
The college's main campuses are located in Arbroath and Dundee:

 Arbroath Campus, Keptie Road, Arbroath
 Kingsway Campus, Old Glamis Road, Dundee
 Gardyne Campus, Gardyne Road, Dundee

The college also operates smaller outreach centres in Forfar, Kirriemuir and Montrose.

History
When the merger was announced the new principal was named as Christina Potter, formerly principal of Dundee College.  Following the retirement of Christina Potter, Grant Ritchie was appointed as principal, taking office on 1 August 2015.  Grant supported the College in planning for the future through its 'Good to Great' project, which won the Campbell Christie award in 2018.  Following Grant's retirement, Simon Hewitt, the College's Vice Principal Curriculum & Attainment was appointed as principal, taking office on 1 August 2020.

Angus College
Angus College was a college in Arbroath founded in 1956.

Dundee College
It was established in 1985 by the merger of Dundee College of Commerce and Kingsway Technical College.

Courses
The College delivers over 1,000 courses from introductory level to degree and post graduate studies. It offers courses for people over the age of sixteen, involving school-level qualifications such as Higher Grade exams, work-based learning, vocational training as well as Further and Higher Education programmes leading to nationally and internationally recognised qualifications including SQA national and higher national certificates and diplomas. Dundee and Angus College also works closely with the city's universities and schools, providing access courses to gain credits needed for advancement to university and providing vocational courses for secondary school students aged 14 and 15 for a few hours a week in fields such as construction, and hairdressing and beauty therapy.

It has campuses and learning centres located across the Tayside region. In Dundee, the College has two campuses: the Kingsway Campus and the recently opened £48million Gardyne Campus.

Courses are offered in the following areas:
 Creative Industries
 Hair and Beauty
 Care and Social Sciences
 Sport and Fitness
 Tourism and Hospitality
 Languages and ESOL
 Business and Management
 Computing
 Engineering and Renewables
 Built Environment
 Science
 Skills for Life and Work

Centres of excellence

It has a number of centres of excellence including a New Media Centre which gives students access to the latest technology for working and learning in industries such as  web design and for developing graphic and animation software; and The Space, a purpose-built venue for performance and training which is the home of the Scottish School of Contemporary Dance. The opening of the Gardyne Campus in 2011 saw the launch of the refurbished Gardyne Theatre, a 400-seat, lyric theatre, open to the public which is the venue for a range of performances including Scottish Opera, theatre groups, and musicians.

Dundee and Angus College Students' Association

DASA is an autonomous, student-led, campaigning organisation, which provides services, representation and welfare support on behalf of its members – the College students.

The day-to-day operation of The Association is fulfilled by the three sabbatical officers, students who have finished college and work full-time for The Association.

References

2013 establishments in Scotland
Education in Dundee
Educational institutions established in 2013
Further education colleges in Scotland